The 23rd Los Angeles Film Critics Association Awards, honoring the best in film for 1997, were voted on in December 1997.

Winners
Best Picture:
L.A. Confidential
Runner-up: The Sweet Hereafter
Best Director:
Curtis Hanson – L.A. Confidential
Runner-up: Atom Egoyan – The Sweet Hereafter
Best Actor:
Robert Duvall – The Apostle
Runner-up: Jack Nicholson – As Good as It Gets
Best Actress:
Helena Bonham Carter – The Wings of the Dove
Runner-up: Jodie Foster – Contact
Best Supporting Actor:
Burt Reynolds – Boogie Nights
Runner-up: Kevin Spacey – L.A. Confidential
Best Supporting Actress:
Julianne Moore – Boogie Nights
Runner-up: Gloria Stuart – Titanic
Best Screenplay:
Curtis Hanson and Brian Helgeland – L.A. Confidential
Runner-up: Kevin Smith – Chasing Amy
Best Cinematography:
Dante Spinotti – L.A. Confidential
Runner-up: Paul Sarossy – The Sweet Hereafter
Best Production Design:
Peter Lamont – Titanic
Runner-up: Jeannine Oppewall – L.A. Confidential
Best Music Score:
Philip Glass – Kundun
Runner-up: James Horner – Titanic
Best Foreign-Language Film:
La Promesse • Belgium/France/Luxembourg
Runner-up: Shall We Dance? (Shall we dansu?) • Japan
Best Non-Fiction Film:
Riding the Rails 
Runner-up: Sick: The Life & Death of Bob Flanagan, Supermasochist
Best Animation (tie):
Hercules
The Spirit of Christmas
The Douglas Edwards Experimental/Independent Film/Video Award:
Finished 
New Generation Award:
Paul Thomas Anderson – Boogie Nights and Hard Eight
Special Citation:
Peter Bogdanovich

References

External links
23rd Annual Los Angeles Film Critics Association Awards

1997
Los Angeles Film Critics Association Awards
Los Angeles Film Critics Association Awards
Los Angeles Film Critics Association Awards
Los Angeles Film Critics Association Awards

ja:第24回ロサンゼルス映画批評家協会賞